Pike is a surname of English origin.

In the United States, Pike is the 1138th most common surname (based on the 1990 census).
In England and Wales, it is the 513th most common surname (based on a Sept 2002 database of the Office for National Statistics). In Newfoundland, Pike is especially common, ranking 22nd among all surnames there (based on the 1955 voters list, as reported by E.R. Seary in "Family Names of the Island of Newfoundland"). At the time of the British Census of 1881, its relative frequency was highest in Wiltshire (7.3 times the British average), followed by Dorset, Devon, Somerset, Berkshire, Hampshire, Nottinghamshire, Gloucestershire, the Channel Islands and Surrey.

The surname has many variations such as Pikes, Pykes, McPike, Picke, Pique along with Speight.

Derivation

The origins of the name are not entirely clear. Individuals may have adopted the surname based
on physical attributes resembling Pike (the fish), an association with Pike (the weapon), or a turnpike (one of the early meanings of which was a turning pike, a horizontal timber that was mounted so as to be able to spin or turn (such turnpikes apparently served as barriers to prevent horses from accessing footpaths, and in other instances to block passage until a toll had been paid). It has also been speculated that the name Pike might be derived in some instances from the word "peak", such as when somebody resided at the peak of a hill (note, for instance, the usage of the word "pike" in the name of Scafell Pike, England's highest mountain).

Notable people with the surname

Albert Pike (1809–1891), American attorney, soldier, writer, and Confederate general
Alfred Pike (1917–2009), Canadian professional ice hockey player
Austin F. Pike (1819–1886), United States senator
Bob Pike (surfer) (1940–1999), Australian surfer
Bronwyn Pike (born 1956), Australian politician
Burton Pike (born 1930), professor of Comparative Literature
Chris Pike (born 1961), Welsh footballer
Chris Pike (American football) (born 1964), American football player
Christa Pike (born 1976), American murderer and the youngest woman to be sentenced to death in the USA during the post-Furman period
Christopher Pike (author), pseudonym of Kevin McFadden (born 1954), American writer
Dave Pike (born 1938), American jazz musician
Frank Pike (soccer) (1930-2010), Canadian soccer player
Geoff Pike (born 1958), English footballer
Geoffry Morgan Pike (born 1929), Author and Cartoonist
Henry Pike (born 1987), Australian politician
Israel Pike (1853–1925), American baseball player
James Pike (1913–1969), American Episcopal bishop, Diocese of California
James Pike (politician) (1818–1895), American congressman
James Shepherd Pike (1811–1882), journalist criticized for distorting Reconstruction era in South Carolina
Jennifer Pike (born 1989), British violinist
Jenny Pike (1922–2004), Canadian photographer and Navy servicewoman
Jill Pike (born 1980), American radio personality
Jim Pike, American singer
John Pike (settler) (1613–1688/1689), settler in Newbury, Massachusetts
Jonathan Pike (born 1949), British architectural painter
Kenneth L. Pike (1912–2000), American linguist and anthropologist
Lip Pike (1845–1893), American star of 19th century baseball, 4x home run champion
Liz Pike (Born 1960), American politician, Republican, in Washington state
 Martin Pike (athlete) (1920–1997), British sprinter
 Martin Pike (English footballer) (born 1964), English footballer
 Martin Pike (Australian footballer) (born 1972), Australian rules footballer
Matt Pike (Born 1972) American Guitarist and Vocalist
Mervyn Pike (1918–2004), British politician
Natalie Pike (born 1983), English model, winner of the Miss British Isles Competition in 2004
 Olive Pike, the married name of Olive Snell (circa 1888–1962), painter
 Oliver Pike (cricketer) (born 1998), Welsh cricketer
 Oliver G. Pike (1877–1963), wildlife photographer and film maker
Otis G. Pike (1921–2014), United States Democratic politician
Patrice Pike (born 1970), American musician
Peter Pike (disambiguation)
Randy Pike (1953-2014), American politician
Rob Pike (born 1956), Canadian software engineer, worked at Bell Labs as a member of the Unix team, now works for Google
Robert Pike (settler) (1616–1706), settler in Newbury, Massachusetts
Rosamund Pike (born 1979), British actress
Samuel Pike (c. 1717 – 1773), English minister
Theodore Pike (1904–1987), Irish colonial administrator and international rugby union player
Thomas Pike (1906–1983), marshal of the Royal Air Force
Victor Pike (1907–1986), Bishop of Sherborne and international rugby union player
William Pike (−1591), Catholic martyr
Zebulon Pike (1779–1813), American soldier and explorer for whom Pikes Peak is named

Fictional characters
Pike (Buffyverse character), in the movie version of Buffy the Vampire Slayer, played by Luke Perry
Pike, in Wings of Fire (book series), one of the Sea Wings who attends Jade Mountain, but is also secretly protecting Princess Anemone who also attends Jade Mountain
Asa Pike, in the Children of the Red King novels
Charles Pike, a ground skills teacher on The Ark who is elected chancellor of Arkadia, in season 3 of The 100
Christopher Pike (Star Trek)
Ernie Pike, in Argentinian comics novel, written by Hector German Oesterheld, drawn by Hugo Pratt
Private Frank Pike, naive young bank clerk and Home Guard private in Dad's Army and It Sticks Out Half a Mile
Gilbert Pike, husband of legendary Newfoundland colonial settler Sheila NaGeira
Joe Pike, Elvis Cole's partner in a series of private-eye novels by Robert Crais
 Langdale Pike, a minor character in The Adventure of the Three Gables, a Sherlock Holmes story by Sir Arthur Conan Doyle
Pike Trickfoot, a gnome cleric portrayed by Ashley Johnson on the web series Critical Role.
Harrison Pike, a character in the 2007 Medal of Honor Vanguard game

References 

English-language surnames